Minister of Foreign Affairs of the Republic of the Congo (known as the People's Republic of the Congo in 1969–92) is a government minister in charge of the Ministry of Foreign Affairs of the Republic of the Congo, responsible for conducting foreign relations of the country.

The following is a list of foreign ministers of the Republic of the Congo since its founding in 1960:

References

Foreign
Foreign Ministers
Politicians